Jared Mezzocchi is an American theatre projection designer and director.

In 2020, Jared was named in a Top 5 List in the New York Times as a Theatre Artist spotlit for their innovative work during the pandemic, alongside Andrew Lloyd Webber and Paula Vogel. His work as a co-director and multimedia designer for Sarah Gancher's RUSSIAN TROLL FARM gained him particular notoriety in the New York Times as Critics Pick and noted as one of the first digitally-native successes for virtual theater.  In 2017, Mezzocchi won an Obie Award,  a Lucille Lortel Award, a Henry Hewes Award, and an Outer Critics Circle and Drama Desk Award nomination for his work on Qui Nguyen's Vietgone at the Manhattan Theatre Club. In recognition of his work with the HERE Arts Center in New York City in 2012, Mezzocchi became the first projection designer to receive a Princess Grace Award in theatre. In 2011, Mezzocchi won the Best Original Playwright award at the New Hampshire Theater Awards. He has collaborated with theatre companies in the U.S. and Europe, including Big Art Group, The Builders Association, 3-Legged Dog, Arena Stage, Studio Theater, Theater J, Center Stage, Olney Theatre Center, Everyman Theatre, Cleveland Play House, Milwaukee Repertory Theater, and Wilma Theater. Currently, he teaches projection design at University of Maryland in Washington, D.C. and serves as Artistic Director of Andy's Summer Playhouse, a youth theatre in Wilton, NH

Awards 
 2021 Mini-Commission for New Work at Vineyard Theatre
 2020 Macdowell Colony Fellow
 2020 Helen Hayes Award Nomination - Outstanding Direction, Curious Incident of the Dog in the Night-Time (Round House Theatre)
 2019 Helen Hayes Award Nomination - Outstanding Original Play Adaptation, How To Catch A Star (The John F. Kennedy Center for the Performing Arts)
 2017 Henry Hewes Design Award - Projection Design, Vietgone (Manhattan Theatre Club)
 2017 Obie Award - Projection Designer
 2017 Lucille Lortel Awards - Projection Design, Vietgone (Manhattan Theatre Club)
 2017 Drama Desk Award (nomination) - Projection Design, Vietgone (Manhattan Theatre Club)
 2017 Outer Critics Circle Award (nomination) - Projection Design, Vietgone (Manhattan Theatre Club)
 2017 Macdowell Colony Fellow 
 2015 Helen Hayes Award (nomination) - Outstanding Lighting Design (with Projections), Totalitarians (Woolly Mammoth Theater) 
 2015 Elliot Norton Awards - Outstanding Design, Astroboy and the God of Comics (Company One)
 2015 IRNE Awards (Independent Reviewers of New England) - Best Projections, Astroboy and the God of Comics (Company One)
 2013 Dance Metro DC Award - Excellence in Stage Design/Multimedia, ISADORA IN RUSSIA (WORD DANCE)
 2012 Princess Grace Awards - HERE Arts Center
 2011 NH Theatre Awards - Best Original Playwright - The Lost World (Andy's Summer Playhouse)

Notable Work

Virtual Performance during the Pandemic, Directing & Multimedia Design  
 2022 SECTION230 - HERE Arts Center URHERE Launch, Multimedia Director & Creator
 2021 On The Beauty of Loss - Vineyard Theatre Mini-Commission, Multimedia Director & Creator
 2020 Russian Troll Farm - Theaterworks Hartford,  TheatreSquared, The Civilians Co-Director, Multimedia Designer
 2020 CANCELLED - Diversionary Theatre  Director, Multimedia Designer

Off-Broadway Design 

 2016 Vietgone - Manhattan Theatre Club

Off-Off Broadway Design 

 2013 The Downtown Loop - 3-Legged Dog
 2013 You Are Dead. You Are Here. - HERE Arts Center

Washington D.C. Design 

 2017 Color's Garden - National Gallery of Art
 2017 I'll Get You Back Again - Roundhouse Theater
 2017 The Arsonists - Woolly Mammoth Theatre Company
 2017 Smart People - Arena Stage
 2017 Intelligence - Arena Stage
 2016 The Nether - Woolly Mammoth Theatre Company
 2014 Stones in his Pockets - Centerstage Baltimore
 2013 Race - Theatre J
 2012 The Elaborate Entrance of Chad Deity - Woolly Mammoth Theatre Company
 2012 Astro Boy and the God of Comics - Studio Theatre

Regional Design 

 2017 Wild & Reckless - Portland Centerstage
 2016 American Song - Milwaukee Rep
 2014 Breath & Imagination - Cleveland Playhouse
 2014 The History of Invulnerability - Milwaukee Rep

Fashion and Industrial 

 2013 Connect4Climate / Alcantara, Design Week - Milan, IT

Multimedia Directing 
 2021 On The Beauty of Loss - Vineyard Theatre Mini-Commission
 2020 Russian Troll Farm - Theaterworks Hartford,  TheatreSquared, The Civilians
 2020 CANCELLED - Diversionary Theatre 
 2019 Curious Incident of the Dog in the Night-Time - Round House Theatre
 2018 How To Catch a Star - The Kennedy Center for the Performing Arts
 2018 Around The World in 80 Days - National Players
 2015 The Lost World - University of Maryland, College Park

References

External links 
 Princess Grace Foundation
 Jared Mezzocchi's Official Website
 Together We Tackle Climate Change, Milan Design Week 2013

Living people
1985 births
Brooklyn College faculty